Stanley Reginald Harry Rogers (7 May 1887 – 21 January 1961) was an American writer, illustrator, and maritime historian. Born in Nottingham, England, his family emigrated to the United States in August 1888, and settled in Olympia, Washington.

He studied art at Goldsmiths' College in London before World War I, where he met his future wife: children's books illustrator Franke Rogers ( Woodhouse). Franke illustrated over 50 children's books, including the popular Robin Family series, which she also wrote. She was also the illustrator of the "Mr. Papingay" books written by Marion St. John Webb, who was a close personal friend from Goldsmiths'. Their son Cedric became an author of many popular geology books.

Rogers wrote and illustrated over 50 books for children and adults between 1920 and 1960. These included Sea Lore, The Atlantic, The Indian Ocean, Enchanted Isles, Gallant Deeds of the War, Hazards of War, Barenetha Rock, and Hazards of the Deep.

The family lived in London for more than 30 years before moving back to New York City after World War II. Toward the end of his life he lived in Yonkers, New York. Rogers died on 21 January 1961, in nearby Bronxville.

External links 
 
 

19th-century American artists
19th-century American historians
19th-century American male writers
1887 births
1961 deaths
American illustrators
American marine artists
American maritime historians
American naval historians
Artists from Nottingham
British emigrants to the United States
Maritime writers
Writers from Olympia, Washington
20th-century American male writers
Historians from Washington (state)